ETL may refer to:

Telecommunications 
 Econet Telecom Lesotho
 Ericsson Telephones Limited, a defunct British telephone equipment manufacture
 Eutelsat, a European satellite operator

Transport 
 ETL, National Rail station code for East Tilbury railway station, in Essex, England
 Electric Traction Limited, a British rolling stock leasing company
 ETL, reporting code for Essex Terminal Railway, in Ontario, Canada
 Express toll lane, similar to a High-occupancy toll lane, expressway lane reserved for toll-paying vehicles

Other uses 
 Ephemerides Theologicae Lovanienses, a theological journal
 ETL Group, a German management consultancy firm
 ETL SEMKO, an electrical certification company
 European Transport Law, a scholarly journal
 Expected tail loss, a measure of financial risk
 Extract, transform, load, a data processing concept